The name Talas has been used for four tropical cyclones in the western north Pacific Ocean. The name was contributed by the Philippines and means "sharpness" (of an object, e.g. a knife) or "acuteness" (of the mind, physical sense, faculty, etc.).

 Tropical Storm Talas (2004) (T0428, 31W, Zosimo) – brushed Ebeye Island and affected Ujae Atoll in the Marshall Islands.
 Severe Tropical Storm Talas (2011) (T1112, 15W) – caused widespread damage in Japan, killing 82.
 Tropical Storm Talas (2017) (T1704, 06W) – made landfall in Central Vietnam and dissipated in Laos, causing 14 fatalities.
 Tropical Storm Talas (2022) (T2215, 17W) – brushed the coast of Japan, claiming 3 lives.

Talas